Hoseynabad-e Qorqi (also Romanized as Ḩoseynābād-e Qorqī; also known as Ḩoseynābād) is a village in Tabadkan Rural District, in the Central District of Mashhad County, Razavi Khorasan Province, Iran. At the 2006 census, its population was 5,175, in 1,247 families.

References 

Populated places in Mashhad County